The second season of CSI: NY originally aired on CBS between September 2005 and May 2006. It consisted of 24 episodes. Its regular time slot continued on Wednesdays at 10pm/9c. The season introduced a new regular character, Lindsay Monroe, after regular Aiden Burn was fired. Vanessa Ferlito, who played Burn, wanted to leave the series to pursue her film career.

Episode 7, "Manhattan Manhunt", was the second part of a two-part crossover with CSI: Miami.

CSI: NY The Complete Second Season was released on DVD in the U.S. on October 17, 2006.

Cast

Main cast
Gary Sinise as Mac Taylor
Melina Kanakaredes as Stella Bonasera
Carmine Giovinazzo as Danny Messer
Vanessa Ferlito as Aiden Burn (episodes 1–2, 23)
Anna Belknap as Lindsay Monroe (episodes 3–24)
Hill Harper as Sheldon Hawkes
Eddie Cahill as Don Flack

Recurring cast
Robert Joy as Sid Hammerback
A. J. Buckley as Adam Ross
Jonah Lotan as Dr. Marty Pino

Special guest star
David Caruso as Horatio Caine

Episodes

References

External links

CSI: NY Season 2 Episode List on Internet Movie Database
CSI: NY Season 2 Episode Guide on CSI Files
CSI: New York on CBS on The Futon Critic

2005 American television seasons
2006 American television seasons
02